Chandra Mohan Patowary is an Indian politician from Assam. As an MLA, he represented the Dharmapur constituency from 1985-1990,1991-1996,1996-2001,2006-2011,2016-till date and served as the Leader of the Opposition in the Assam Legislative Assembly from 2006-2011. He was the Health Minister of Assam from 1985-1990 and Agriculture Minister from 1996-2001. He was the President of the Asom Gana Parishad (AGP) during 2008-2011. He resigned owning responsibility for the party's poor performance in the 2011 Assam Legislative Assembly elections. In 2014, he joined the Bharatiya Janata Party (BJP) in presence of then BJP National President Rajnath Singh and State President of BJP Assam Pradesh Shri Sarbananda Sonowal.

References

External links 
 Official website

1955 births
Living people
Asom Gana Parishad politicians
National Democratic Alliance candidates in the 2014 Indian general election
People from Nalbari district
Leaders of the Opposition in Assam
Assam MLAs 1985–1991
Assam MLAs 1991–1996
Assam MLAs 1996–2001
Assam MLAs 2006–2011
Assam MLAs 2016–2021
State cabinet ministers of Assam
Bharatiya Janata Party politicians from Assam
Assam MLAs 2021–2026